Odderhei is a neighbourhood in the city of Kristiansand in Agder county, Norway. It's located in the borough of Oddernes and in the district of Randesund.  The neighborhood is located northwest of Tømmerstø and Holte. The nearby district of Søm lies to the north.

References

Geography of Kristiansand
Neighbourhoods of Kristiansand